Alexander Archibald may refer to:
 Alexander Archibald (politician) (1869–1922), mayor of Newark, New Jersey
 Alexander Lackie Archibald (1788–1859), farmer, tanner, boot manufacturer and politician in Nova Scotia
 Sandy Archibald, Alexander "Sandy" Archibald, (1897–1946), Scottish footballer

See also